Shuttle Loop is a steel launched Shuttle Loop roller coaster  manufactured by Anton Schwarzkopf in Nagashima Spa Land in Japan. It is one of six Shuttle Loop roller coasters still operating around the world.

Ride experience 

The ride takes off and goes through a loop. It then goes up a hill, loses momentum, and goes backwards through the loop. It goes past the station to another hill. It then loses speed and goes back to the station and ends. The complete ride is about 20-30 seconds.

References

External links 
 

Shuttle roller coasters
Roller coasters introduced in 1980
Roller coasters in Japan